On the 15 June 2011 a Eurocopter AS 350B3 Ecureuil operated a ferry flight from Pont d’Incles to Juclar refuge centre in the NorthEast of Andorra. While en-route the pilots lost control and crashed into mountainside, killing five of the six on board. The accident is the deadliest air accident in Andorra.

References

2011 disasters in Europe
2011 in Andorra
Aviation accidents and incidents in Andorra
Accidents and incidents involving helicopters
Aviation accidents and incidents in 2011
June 2011 events in Europe